Nassira Rezig (born 4 November 1983) is an Algerian former footballer who played as a goalkeeper. She has been a member of the Algeria women's national team.

Club career
Rezig has played for Affak Relizane in Algeria.

International career
Rezig capped for Algeria at senior level during the 2010 African Women's Championship.

References

1983 births
Living people
Algerian women's footballers
Women's association football goalkeepers
Algeria women's international footballers
21st-century Algerian people